Katherine Whiteman (1945 - 4 January 2009) was a British food writer.

Early life
She was born Katherine Ellenbogen in Hampstead, London, the daughter of Gershon Ellenbogen, a British barrister, author and Liberal Party politician, and his wife Eileen Alexander.

Career
Whiteman edited books by the chefs Michel Roux, Raymond Blanc and Pierre Koffman.

Personal life
She was married to the barrister Peter Whiteman QC, and they had two daughters.

Whiteman died in a car accident in Argentina on 4 January 2009.

Legacy
The Guild of Food Writers created the Kate Whiteman Award for Work on Food and Travel in her honour. It has been awarded to Michael Booth and Yotam Ottolenghi, among others.

References

1945 births
2009 deaths
British food writers
Ellenbogen family